Lewis Jack Ganson (1913 – 22 December 1980) was an English magician who became one of the most prolific writers in magic, going on to write and edit more than sixty books on the subject.

Career

For years, he was the editor of Harry Stanley's The Gen and contributor to Magigram magazines. He was also a vice president of the British Ring of the International Brotherhood of Magicians and founder member of the Portsmouth and district magic circle.

Ganson was a professional close-up magician except for his time in the Royal Army Ordnance Corps 1939–1958.

Published works 
 Expert Manipulation of Playing Cards (1948)
 How Right You Are (1948)
 Routined Manipulation, Vol. 1 (1950)
 Routined Manipulation, Vol. 2 (1952)
 Routined Manipulation Finale (1954)
 A Magician Explains (1955)
 Unconventional Magic (1956)
 Cy Enfield's Entertaining Card Magic (part I, II and III – 1955–1958)
 Dai Vernon Book of Magic (1957)
 Dai Vernon's Cups and Balls (1958)
 Dai Vernon's Symphony of the Rings (1958)
 Vernon's Inner Secrets of Card Magic (1959)
 Vernon's More Inner Secrets of Card Magic (1960)
 The Magic of Slydini (1960)
 Magic of the Mind (1960)
 Vernon's More Secrets of Card Magic (1960)
 Vernon's Further Secrets of Card Magic (1961)
 Dai Vernon's Tribute to Nate Leipzig (1963)
 Malini and his Magic (1963)
 Ron Macmillan's Symphony of the Spheres (1963)
 Marconick's Silk Magic (1964)
 Give a Magician Enough Rope (1966)
 Vernon's Ultimate Secrets of Card Magic (1967)
 Art of Close-up, The Vol. 1 (1966)
 Art of Close-up, The Vol. 2 (1966)
 Card Magic by Manipulation (1971)
 Reelistic Magic (1972)
 Mini Slate Magic (1973)
 Magic with Faucett Ross (1975)
 Immaculate Card Magic of Walt Lees (1975)
 Fan Finale (1975)
 Ganson Teach-In Series (1977–1987)
 Tiny Trio (1978)
 Three Little Words (1978)
 The Magic of Frederica (1981)
 The Ganson Book (1982)
 The Essential Dai Vernon (2009)
 The Complete Ganson Teach-In Series (2010)

Awards and honors
 Magic Castle Academy of Magical Arts' first Literary Fellowship in 1968.

See also 

 List of magicians
 Card magic
 Coin magic
 Sleight of hand

References

External links 

Lewis Ganson – Dai Vernon book of Magic bibliography

1913 births
1980 deaths
Card magic
Coin magic
English magicians
Historians of magic
Sleight of hand
British Army personnel of World War II
Royal Army Ordnance Corps soldiers
Military personnel from Essex
Academy of Magical Arts Literature & Media Fellowship winners